Sawantwadi Assembly constituency is one of the 288 Vidhan Sabha (legislative assembly) constituencies of Maharashtra state in western India.

Overview
Sawantwadi constituency is one of the three Vidhan Sabha constituencies located in the Sindhudurg district. It comprises the entire Vengurla, Sawantwadi and Dodamarg tehsils of the district.

Sawantwadi is part of the Ratnagiri-Sindhudurg Lok Sabha constituency along with five other Vidhan Sabha segments, namely Kankavli and Kudal (part of Sindhudurg district) and Chiplun, Ratnagiri and Rajapur (part of Ratnagiri district).

Members of Legislative Assembly

See also
 Sawantvadi
 List of constituencies of Maharashtra Vidhan Sabha

References

Assembly constituencies of Maharashtra
Sindhudurg district
Sawantwadi